Rokiškis Manor is a former residential manor in Rokiškis. From 1952, used by Rokiškis Region Museum.

History
Rokiškis manor was first mentioned in 1499. The estate belonged to the duchess Elena, Vilnius voivode Mikołaj Radziwiłł. In the beginning of 16th century it went to Timofej Kroszinski and his descendants, the last of whom was Juzef Kroszinski who died in 1715. From 1715 the estate belonged to Tyzenhaus family. Since the beginning of 19th century the manor became permanent residence of count Ignacy Tyzenhaus. During his lifetime new classicist palace was built in 1801 with two officines from both sides. After Tyzenhaus, the estate became the residence of Przeździecki family. In 1905 Jan Przeździecki had started the renovation of the manor pursuant to the project of Karolis Jankovskis and Pranciškus Lilpopas. The palace became more spacious and higher. Yet, its classicist style became eclectic with features of Neo-Baroque, Neo-Gothic and Neo-Renaissance.

In 1940 after the Soviet Union occupied Lithuania, the estate was nationalized. After the World War II, the manor housed Rokiškis Sovkhoz, later on cultural institutions.

Restoration works took place in Rokiskis Manor at the end of the 20th century.

In 2011 Rokiškis manor became a winner in the Tourism and Regeneration of Physical Sites category by EU's project EDEN.

External links
Official website (English)

References

Manor houses in Lithuania
Classicism architecture in Lithuania